The pale-billed parrotbill (Chleuasicus atrosuperciliaris), also known as the black-browed parrotbill or lesser rufous-headed parrotbill, is a species of parrotbill in the family Paradoxornithidae.

It is found in Bangladesh, Bhutan, China, India, Laos, Myanmar, and Thailand.

Its natural habitats are subtropical or tropical moist lowland forests and subtropical or tropical moist montane forests.

References

 Robson, C. (2007). Family Paradoxornithidae (Parrotbills) pp.  292–321 in; del Hoyo, J., Elliott, A. & Christie, D.A. eds. Handbook of the Birds of the World, Vol. 12. Picathartes to Tits and Chickadees. Lynx Edicions, Barcelona.

pale-billed parrotbill
pale-billed parrotbill
Birds of Bhutan
Birds of Northeast India
Birds of Myanmar
Birds of Laos
Birds of Vietnam
pale-billed parrotbill
Taxonomy articles created by Polbot